Berceni can refer to:

Berceni, Bucharest, a quarter in Bucharest, Romania
Berceni metro station
Berceni, Ilfov, a commune in Ilfov County
Berceni, Prahova, a commune in Prahova County